Birmingham, Sparkbrook and Small Heath was a parliamentary constituency represented in the House of Commons of the Parliament of the United Kingdom. It elected one Member of Parliament (MP) by the first-past-the-post system of election. The constituency was notable for having the largest percentage of Muslim voters of any UK constituency at 48.8% (based on 2001 census figures).

The seat was abolished following a review of parliamentary boundaries by the Boundary Commission for England.

History

Boundaries
The City of Birmingham wards of Fox Hollies, Small Heath, Sparkbrook, and Sparkhill.

This was an inner-city residential seat in the south-east of Birmingham, noted for its large immigrant population.

In the first half of the 20th century, it was home to many Irish families. In more recent times it is populated by people of Asian origin, who now account for some 50% of residents—the highest proportion of any seat in the country. The majority of ethnic minorities in this area are of Pakistani and British Pakistani origin.

By 2010, unemployment was high, at well over 10%. There are hardly any white collar workers in the seat and it has the third highest proportion of only partly skilled workers in the country.

However, it is a major site for urban regeneration and some £35m is to be invested in local redevelopment initiatives over the next five years.

The constituency was historically a safe seat Labour, but in 2005 their incumbent MP Roger Godsiff saw his majority slashed to just over 3,000 following a strong challenge from RESPECT. Labour also lost many local council seats in the constituency, primarily to the Liberal Democrats but also to the now-defunct People's Justice Party and later to RESPECT's Salma Yaqoob in the Sparkbrook ward.

Boundary review
Following their review of parliamentary representation in Birmingham and the West Midlands, the Boundary Commission for England abolished the Sparkbrook and Small Heath constituency.

The Sparkbrook electoral ward formed one part of a revised Birmingham Hall Green constituency. The incumbent MP Roger Godsiff was selected for the new Hall Green seat, and won the seat at the 2010 election.

Members of Parliament
Roger Godsiff of the Labour Party represented this seat throughout its existence. From 1992 he had been MP for Birmingham Small Heath, which was merged with Birmingham Sparkbrook to create this seat.

Elections

Elections in the 2000s

Elections in the 1990s

See also
List of parliamentary constituencies in the West Midlands (county)
Sparkbrook and Small Heath

References

Constituencies of the Parliament of the United Kingdom established in 1997
Constituencies of the Parliament of the United Kingdom disestablished in 2010
Small Heath, Birmingham